Chen Xiaoli (born February 20, 1981 or 1982 in Fuxin, Liaoning) is a female Chinese basketball player who was part of the teams that won gold medals at the 2002 Asian Games, the 2006 Asian Games, and the 2010 Asian Games. She competed at the 2008 Summer Olympics in Beijing and the 2012 Summer Olympics in London.

References

1982 births
Living people
Chinese women's basketball players
Basketball players at the 2008 Summer Olympics
Basketball players at the 2012 Summer Olympics
Olympic basketball players of China
People from Fuxin
Basketball players from Liaoning
Asian Games medalists in basketball
Basketball players at the 2002 Asian Games
Basketball players at the 2006 Asian Games
Basketball players at the 2010 Asian Games
Asian Games gold medalists for China
Medalists at the 2002 Asian Games
Medalists at the 2006 Asian Games
Medalists at the 2010 Asian Games
Liaoning Flying Eagles players
Henan Phoenix players